Moses Griffith may refer to:

Moses Griffith (physician) (1724–1785), English physician
Moses Griffith or Gruffydd, co-founder of Plaid Cymru

See also
Moses Griffiths, Welsh draughtsman, engraver and water colourist